Rainbow Without Colours (Vietnamese: Cầu vồng không sắc) is a 2015 Vietnamese film directed by Nguyen Quang Tuyen. It was screened at the 39th Montreal World Film Festival. The film stars Nguyen Thanh Tu as Hoang and Vu Tuan Viet as Hung, and focuses on the romantic relationship between two stepbrothers and their parents after they announce their love to their family. The film received good reviews from both critics and audiences.

Plot
Mr. and Mrs. Huynh are a wealthy marriage that lives in Ho Chi Minh City with their two children, Hoang and Lan, and their adopted son, Hung. The two boys spent all the time together, and one day, they announce their love to their family. However, their mother cannot accept it and tries to stop her sons from following a homosexual lifestyle. Her blind motherly love drives Hung to his death and Hoang to madness. The film mainly focuses on the relationship between parents and their children in Vietnam, where parents always think they have done the best for their offspring.

Cast 
Nguyen Thanh Tu as Huynh Anh Hoang
Vu Tuan Viet as Phan Trong Hung
Khanh Kim as Mrs. Huynh
Tung Yuki as Mr. Huynh
Viet My as Huynh Lan
NSƯT Le Thien as Grandma
NSƯT Thanh Dien as Grandpa
Nguyen Hoang as Hoang (young)
Nguyen Minh Thien Khoi as Hung (young)

Reception
When the film was screened in Vietnam in March 2015, it got special attention from both press and audience, with thousands of reviews from users on social media network such as Facebook. It was described as the only one Vietnamese film that "made audiences cry".

Awards

References

External links
 

2015 films
2015 drama films
2015 LGBT-related films
Vietnamese drama films
Vietnamese-language films
Vietnamese LGBT-related films
LGBT-related drama films